The Curve is a Canadian short film series, released in 2020 by the National Film Board of Canada as a response to the COVID-19 pandemic.

Based around the concept of documenting a strange and unique period in history, the project commissioned various filmmakers to make short films which were distributed by the NFB on a dedicated streaming platform. The only rules were that the film had to be about life during the pandemic, and that the filmmakers had to follow whatever health guidelines and restrictions were in place where they lived; otherwise, they were given carte blanche to make their film in any format they wanted.

The most successful films in the project were Andrea Dorfman's How to Be At Home, which accrued over 55,000 views within just a few weeks of its debut and was named to the Toronto International Film Festival's year-end Canada's Top Ten list for short films, and Eli Jean Tahchi's Sometimes I Wish I Was on a Desert Island (Y’a des fois où j’aimerais me trouver sur une île déserte), which was a Prix Iris nominee for Best Short Documentary at the 24th Quebec Cinema Awards.

Films

See also
Greetings from Isolation

References

External links

2020 in Canadian cinema
Films about the COVID-19 pandemic
Canadian film series
National Film Board of Canada series